The yellow-mouth pikeblenny (Chaenopsis schmitti) is a species of chaenopsid blenny found in coral reefs in the eastern central Pacific ocean. It can reach a maximum length of  TL. The specific name honours the carcinologist Waldo L. Schmitt (1887-1977) who was Curator of the Division of Marine Invertebrates in the US National Museum and who was responsible for the collection of the two types.

References
 Böhlke, J. E. 1957 (26 July) A review of the blenny genus Chaenopsis, and the description of a related new genus from the Bahamas. Proceedings of the Academy of Natural Sciences of Philadelphia v. 109: 81-103, Pls. 5–6.

schmitti
Western Central American coastal fauna
Galápagos Islands coastal fauna
Fish described in 1957
Taxa named by James Erwin Böhlke